List of newspapers published by Newsquest.

Daily titles 

 Bolton News
 Bradford Telegraph & Argus
 Colchester Evening Gazette
 Daily Echo, Bournemouth
 Dorset Echo
 Echo, Essex
 Evening Times, Glasgow
 Greenock Telegraph
 Lancashire Telegraph
 News and Star, Cumbria
 Oxford Mail
 Southern Daily Echo
 South Wales Argus
 Swindon Advertiser
 The Argus, Brighton
 The Herald, Glasgow
 The Mail, Cumbria
 The National, Scotland
 The National, Wales
 The Northern Echo
 The Press, York
 Worcester News

Weekly titles 

 Andover Advertiser
 Ardrossan and Saltcoats Herald
 Armley & Wortley Advertiser
 Asian Eye
 Avon Advertiser, Salisbury
 Ayrshire Weekly Press
 Banbury Cake
 Barnes, Mortlake & Sheen Times
 Barnet & Potters Bar Times
 Barry & District News
 Basildon Recorder
 Basingstoke Gazette
 Berrow's Worcester Journal
 Bexley News Shopper
 Bicester Advertiser
 Bishops Stortford Citizen
 Blackburn Citizen Group
 Blackpool Citizen Group
 Bolton Journal
 Borehamwood & Elstree Times
 Bradford Target
 Braintree & Witham Times
 Bramhall Community News
 Bramley Advertiser
 Brentford, Chiswick and Isleworth Times
 Brentwood/Billericay Weekly News
 Bridgwater Mercury
 Bridport & Lyme Regis News
 Brighton and Hove Leader
 Bromley News Shopper
 Bromsgrove Advertiser
 Bucks Free Press
 Burnham & Highbridge Weekly News
 Burnley Citizen Group
 Bury Journal
 Bury Times
 Caerphilly Campaign
 Campaign Quicksearch
 Castlepoint/Rayleigh Standard
 Chard & Ilminster News
 Chelmsford and Mid Essex Times
 Cheltenham Independent
 Chester-le-Street Advertiser
 Chorley Citizen
 Clacton & Frinton Gazette
 Colchester & East Essex Express
 Congleton Guardian
 Consett & Stanley Advertiser
 County Independent
 Craven Herald & Pioneer
 Crewe & Nantwich Guardian
 Croydon Guardian
 Cummnock Chronicle (Ayrshire)
 Darlington & Stockton Times
 Darlington/Aycliffe Advertiser
 Devizes, Melksham & Vale of Pewsey News
 Dorking Life
 Dorset Advertiser
 Dudley News
 Dunfermline Press
 Durham Advertiser
 Ealing Times
 Edgware & Mill Hill Times
 Elmbridge Guardian
 Enfield Independent
 Epping Forest Guardian
 Epping, North Weald & Ongar Guardian
 Epsom & Banstead Guardian
 Essex County Standard
 Essex Weekly News
 Evesham Admag
 Evesham Journal
 Falmouth Packet – see Packet Newspapers.
 Fish 4 Jobs Yorkshire
 Gatwick Life
 Gazette & Herald, Wiltshire
 Gloucester Independent
 Gloucestershire County Gazette
 Halesowen News
 Halstead Gazette
 Hampshire Chronicle
 Haringey Independent
 Harlow Citizen
 Harrow Times
 Harwich & Manningtree Standard
 Helston Packet – see Packet Newspapers
 Hendon & Finchley Times
 Hereford Times
 Hillingdon & Uxbridge Times
 Horley Life
 Ilkley Gazette
 Isle of Wight County Press
 Keighley News
 Keighley & Craven Target
 Kingston Guardian
 Knutsford Guardian
 Lancaster & Morecambe Citizen
 Largs and Millport Weekly News
 Ledbury Gazette
 Leigh Journal
 Leisure Review
 Lewisham News Shopper
 Loughton, Chigwell and Buckhurst Hill Guardian
 Ludlow Advertiser
 Maldon & Burnham Standard
 Malvern Gazette
 Mid Devon Star
 Mid Sussex Leader
 Milford Mercury
 Muswell Hill & Crouch End Times
 New Forest Post
 NewsExtra, Eastleigh & Winchester
 Newton & Golborne Guardian
 North Yorks Advertiser
 Northwich Guardian
 Oswestry & Border Counties Advertizer
 Oxfordshire Herald
 Oxford Star
 Packet Newspapers
 Penarth Times
 Penwith Pirate
 Pontypool Free Press
 Powys County Times
 Preston Citizen Group
 Prestwich & Whitefield Guide
 Property Weekly
 Pudsey Advertiser
 Putney & Wandsworth Guardian
 Putney & Wimbledon Times
 Radcliffe Times
 Reading Chronicle
 Redbridge, Waltham Forest & West Essex Guardian
 Redditch Advertiser
 Redruth/Camborne Packet – see Packet Newspapers
 Redhill & Reigate Life
 Richmond & Twickenham Times
 Runcorn & Widnes World
 St Albans & Harpenden Observer
 St Albans & Harpenden Review
 St Helens Star
 Sale & Altrincham Messenger
 Salisbury Journal
 Sedgemoor Star
 Somerset County Gazette
 Southampton Advertiser
 South Bucks Star
 South Coast & Lewes Leader
 Southend Standard
 Southern Property Advertiser
 South Wales Guardian
 Stourbridge News
 Stratford Guardian
 Streatham Guardian
 Stretford & Urmston Messenger
 Stroud News & Journal
 Sunday Herald (Glasgow)
 Surrey Comet
 Sutton Guardian
 Swanage & Wareham Advertiser
 Swindon Star
 Target Series (Bradford)
 Taunton Star
 Teddington and Hampton Times
 Tenbury Wells Advertiser
 Tewkesbury AdMag
 The Cleveland Clarion
 The Impartial Reporter
 The Oxford Times
 The Romsey Advertiser
 The Shuttle
 The South Lakes Citizen
 The Watford Free
 Thurrock Gazette
 Tivyside Advertiser (Cardigan, Ceredigion)
 Tottenham & Wood Green Independent
 Truro Packet – see Packet Newspapers
 Waltham Abbey Guardian
 Waltham Forest Independent
 Waltham Forest Guardian
 Walton & Weybridge Guardian
 Wandsworth Guardian
 Wanstead and Woodford Guardian
 Warrington Guardian
 Watford Observer
 Wear Valley Advertiser
 Welwyn & Hatfield Review
 West Craven Town Crier
 Western Telegraph, Pembrokeshire
 Westmorland Gazette
 Weymouth & Dorchester Advertiser
 Wharfedale & Airedale Observer
 Whitchurch Herald
 Widnes World
 Wilts & Gloucestershire Standard
 Wiltshire Star
 Wiltshire Times Group
 Wimbledon Guardian
 Wimbledon News
 Winsford & Middlewich Guardian
 Wirral Globe
 Witney Gazette
 Yeovil Express
 York Advertiser
 York Star

External links 
 Official Newsquest website
 Newsquest's own list of its newspapers

Newsquest